Seven Years Hard Luck is a 1940 German romantic comedy film directed by Ernst Marischka and starring Hans Moser, Ida Wüst and Olly Holzmann.

The film's sets were designed by the art directors Hans Ledersteger and Heinrich Richter. The film was produced by the independent company Styria-Film in German-controlled Austria. It was followed by a sequel Seven Years of Good Luck in 1942.

Synopsis
After breaking a mirror, a writer is convinced he will have seven years' bad luck. This complicates his romantic aspirations.

Cast
 Hans Moser as Dr. Teisinger
 Ida Wüst as Frau Teisinger
 Olly Holzmann as Gertie
 Ida Turay as Lilly
 Wolf Albach-Retty as Heinz Kersten
 Theo Lingen as Paul, Kerstens Diener
 Oskar Sima as Poppelbaum
 Alfred Neugebauer as Lillys Chef
 Robert Valberg as Standesbeamter
 Oskar Wegrostek as Dicker Mann
 Lina Frank as Wirtschafterin bei Dr. Teisinger
 Eugen Guenther as Freund von Dr. Teisinger
 Pepi Glöckner-Kramer as Frau mit dem kranken Kanarienvogel
 Johannes Roth as Beamter der Korrespondenzabteilung

References

Bibliography
 Bock, Hans-Michael & Bergfelder, Tim. The Concise CineGraph. Encyclopedia of German Cinema. Berghahn Books, 2009.
 Robert Von Dassanowsky. Austrian Cinema. McFarland & Co, 2005.

External links 
 

1940 films
1940 romantic comedy films
German romantic comedy films
Films of Nazi Germany
1940s German-language films
Films directed by Ernst Marischka
German black-and-white films
1940s German films